Aleksandar Mladenović (Bitola, 25 August 1930 – Belgrade, 6 April 2010) was a Serbian linguist, member of the Serbian Academy of Arts and Sciences and an associate of Matica srpska.

Biography
Born in Bitola, Mladenović finished high school in Kruševac in 1949, continuing his studies at the Department for Serbian Language and Literature of Belgrade's Faculty of Philosophy. Already as a student he won several prestigious awards.

Mladenović began his career as an assistant professor of history of Serbian language at Novi Sad's Faculty of Philosophy where in 1963 he obtained his PhD. He became a professor in 1968 and the head of the department in 1985, the position he held until his retirement in 1995.

From 1978 until his death he was the head of the Archaeographical department of the National Library in Belgrade. He was also president of the Committee for Kosovo and Metohija and of the Committee for Dialectology.

Scientific work
Mladenović mostly wrote about the history of Serbian literary language and vernacular in the period of 1750 to 1850, as well as from late Middle Ages (15th century). He was also interested in work of Njegoš about whom he published a number of papers and two books. His edition of Mountain Wreath (from 2001) is considered the best when it comes to comments and explanations.

In 1979 he started the magazine Arheografski prilozi which he edited for a long run of years. He was also editor in chief of Zbornik Matice srpske za filologiju i lingvistiku and of Srpski dijalektološki zbornik.

He was a guest professor at universities of Leningrad, Warsaw, Kraków, Sofia, Sarajevo and Skopje.

References

External links
 Preminuo akademik Aleksandar Mladenović 

1930 births
2010 deaths
Members of the Serbian Academy of Sciences and Arts
Linguists from Serbia
Academic staff of the University of Novi Sad